Hinukh (or alternatively Hinuq, Hinux, Ginukh, or Ginux) could refer to:
Hinuq language
Hinukh people